This list provides an overview of the motive power operated by Deutsche Bahn. It only includes those vehicles that have been in service with the Deutsche Bahn AG since its formation on 1 January 1994.

The classes are numbered according to the locomotive classification of the Deutsche Bundesbahn, which had been adopted by Deutsche Bahn in 1994.

Since 2007, classifications for all German railway companies are centrally issued by the Federal Railway Office in line with UIC classification rules.

Steam locomotives 

Several narrow gauge steam locomotives were taken over by Deutsche Bahn, which until 2004 were handed over to communal services or heritage railways.

Electric locomotives

Diesel locomotives

Minor locomotives

Electric multiple units

Accumulator Cars

Diesel multiple units

Railway works vehicles

References 
 https://de.wikipedia.org/wiki/Liste_der_Lokomotiv-_und_Triebwagenbaureihen_der_Deutschen_Bahn

See also 
Deutsche Bahn
UIC identification marking for tractive stock

Locomotives of Germany
Deutsche Bundesbahn locomotives
Deutsche Bahn